Westminster Abbey Choir School is a boarding preparatory school for boys in Westminster, London and the only remaining choir school in the United Kingdom which exclusively educates choristers (i.e. only choirboys attend the school). It is located in Dean's Yard, by Westminster Abbey.  It educates about 30 boys, aged 8–13 who sing in the Choir of Westminster Abbey, which takes part in state and national occasions as well as singing evensong every day (except Wednesday) and gives concert performances worldwide. Recent tours include to America, Hungary and Moscow. Other tours have included Australia, America and Hong Kong.
The school is one of only three choir schools that educate only the male trebles of the choir, the others being Saint Thomas Choir School in New York City and Escolania de Montserrat in Spain.
The headmaster is Peter Roberts, former assessment co-ordinator of St George's School, Windsor Castle.  The organist and master of the choristers is James O'Donnell, former Master of Music at Westminster Cathedral.

History
The school is believed to have been founded around 1560, as the choir boys of Westminster Abbey have been educated there since Elizabethan times. The present school was built in 1915 (2015 being its centenary year) and underwent renovations in 1990s.

The two houses of the Choir School are named after the musicians John Blow and Henry Purcell, who were both Organists of Westminster Abbey, and who are both buried in the abbey.

Governors
The Chairman of the Governors of the school is David Hoyle, the Dean of Westminster.

Inspections
The school was inspected by the Independent Schools Inspectorate in October 2015.

Curriculum
As a choir school, boys are selected by musical ability. The Dean and Chapter meet the cost of their vocal training and at least
eighty per cent of the cost of their education. The regular school curriculum is not neglected and pupils are taught the required National Curriculum subjects as well as Latin, French and Greek.

The choir
The choir makes frequent broadcasts and recordings. The choir's most recent recording is a CD of Hubert Parry's Songs of Farewell, which is on Hyperion Records.

Tours
The choir has travelled across the world to perform tours, most recently in Australia, the United States, China, Moscow, Rome, and Hungary. Generally these tours take place once every two years. The choir was due to go to Spain in 2009, but due to the recession it could not go ahead. The choir undertook a choir tour to the US in October 2014, singing in concert halls and churches around the country.

Notable former pupils

Christopher Brown, composer
Tim Brown, choral director
James Burton, conductor
Alan Civil, French horn orchestral player
Gabriel Crouch, baritone, choral conductor
Adrian Cruft, composer
Brian Easdale, composer
Clive Farahar, antiquarian book dealer
Neil Jenkins, tenor
William Wallace, Baron Wallace of Saltaire, academic
James Wilkinson, author and former BBC science correspondent
David Willcocks, conductor, organist and composer
Guy Woolfenden, composer

Notable staff
In the 1950s, the celebrated singer John Whitworth taught maths at the school.

See also
Westminster Abbey

References

External links

Westminster Abbey Choir and Choir School History
A history of the choristers of Westminster Abbey

16th-century establishments in England
1848 establishments in England
Cathedral schools
Choir schools in England
 
Church of England private schools in the Diocese of London
Grade II listed buildings in the City of Westminster
Educational institutions established in 1848
Private boys' schools in London
Private schools in the City of Westminster
 
Preparatory schools in London
Choir